Rene Paulo (born in 1930 - January 12, 2023) was an American pianist. Born in the rural district of Schofield, Wisconsin,  Paulo grew up in Wahiawa, Hawaii. His grandparents on his mother's side were from the Philippines, becoming naturalized US citizens after his grandfather joined the US military. Rene's musical background was in classical music, and he studied briefly at the Juilliard School of Music in New York with Lonnie Epstein and Gerald Tracy. He soon branched out into improvisation, listening to jazz pianists such as Art Tatum, Alec Templeton, Fats Waller, Earl "Fatha" Hines, and boogie woogie styles. He is known as "Hawaii's Favorite and Most Famous Pianist" and has been invited repeatedly to perform in Las Vegas, Los Angeles, and Tokyo. Paulo played with famous artists like Alfred Apaka, Hilo Hattie, Don Ho and Sandii. He has played music at a church in Kapolei, Hawaii that was founded by Pastor Danny Yamashiro and is the father of cosmopolitan and versatile saxophonist Michael Paulo.

Discography
Black Coral, Liberty Records, 1959
Enchanted Garden, Mahalo Records, 1960 
Rene Paulo Plays in Person , Mahalo Records, 1962
Tropical Heat Wave, 1963
Whispering Sands, 1964
The Best of Rene Paulo, 1995
The Best of Rene & Akemi Paulo, 1996
Surftides, 2002
Waimanalo Moon, 2003

References

American classical pianists
Male classical pianists
American male pianists
Living people
1930 births
People with acquired American citizenship
People from Wahiawa, Hawaii
American musicians of Filipino descent
20th-century American pianists
21st-century classical pianists
20th-century American male musicians
21st-century American male musicians
21st-century American pianists